Little Brother of God is a 1922 British silent crime film directed by F. Martin Thornton.

Cast
 Alec Fraser as Donald Wainwright  
 Lionelle Howard as Douglas Wainwright  
 Victor McLaglen as King Kennidy  
 Varies Nickawa as Jean Marie  
 Fred Rains as Father Joseph  
 Fred Raynham as Bliss  
 Valia as Helen McKee  
 Robert Vallis as Johnny Jackpine  
 Bertie Wright as Etienne Parouche

References

Bibliography
 Goble, Alan. The Complete Index to Literary Sources in Film. Walter de Gruyter, 1999.

External links

1922 films
1922 crime films
British silent feature films
British crime films
1920s English-language films
Films directed by Floyd Martin Thornton
Films based on British novels
Stoll Pictures films
British black-and-white films
1920s British films